The Plaxton Pointer (originally known as the Reeve Burgess Pointer, and later as the TransBus Pointer and Alexander Dennis Pointer) is a single-decker bus body that was manufactured during the 1990s by Reeve Burgess, Plaxton and latterly built by Alexander Dennis.

History
With the launch of the Dennis Dart in 1989, Plaxton launched the Pointer body on the short 8.5 metre chassis. It was initially built by its Reeve Burgess subsidiary, before moving to Plaxton's Scarborough factory. Launched in 1991, at 2.3 metres wide, this proved popular with many operators, and they sold in big numbers to London Regional Transport. The modular nature of both chassis and body meant for various permutations in length, with 8.5, 9.0 and 9.8 metre variants being manufactured. The Pointer became the most successful midibus body. The Pointer was also available with Volvo B6 chassis.

The introduction of the Super Low Floor version of the Dennis Dart, the Dart SLF, in 1995 saw the Pointer body redesigned with a 2.4 metre width, with a step-free entrance, giving easy access for disabled people. This redesigned Pointer bodywork was also built on the Volvo B6LE, one for the UK and the other 20 for Citybus of Hong Kong. The low floor Plaxton Pointer 1 and the Plaxton Pointer 2 have a rounded roof dome (more rounded than the step entrance Pointer) with a double-curvature windscreen. Not long after, the body received an all-new lower front end design, and alterations to the rest of the body - the Pointer 2 was born, and has proved to be just as successful. This was also available in a range of lengths to suit individual needs - 9.3 m, 10.1 m, 10.7 m, 11.3 m "Super Pointer Dart" (SPD), and after 3 years of production, the 8.8 m "Mini Pointer Dart" (MPD). The 11.3 m "Super Pointer Dart" (SPD) is considered as a full-sized single-decker bus. The Pointer 2 was built almost exclusively on Dart SLF chassis, except for a single prototype − NK53 TJV, delivered to Arriva North East − which was built on the experimental Blue Bird LFCC9 chassis.

In 1998, the Mayflower Group, owner of Alexander Coachbuilders, took over Dennis. The future of the Pointer at that time appeared uncertain as it was thought the Dart may be solely bodied by Alexander. As a result, Plaxton built two Pointer bodies on the Volvo B6BLE chassis known as Bus 2000, but the project was scrapped when Mayflower also purchased Plaxton, forming TransBus International. Certain design features of the scrapped Bus 2000 project have since been used on other designs, most notably the Alexander Dennis Enviro300 and Enviro500.

Alexander Dennis
With the collapse of TransBus in 2004 and subsequent restructuring by the administrators, Plaxton and Alexander Dennis were sold to different parties. As Pointer production had been transferred to the former Alexander plant at Falkirk, it became an Alexander Dennis product. Plaxton, once again an independent company, signalled its return to the bus market by developing the Centro on VDL and MAN chassis in 2005 to join its Primo low-floor minibus in competition with the Pointer.

In August 2006 Alexander Dennis launched the Enviro200 Dart as a replacement for the Pointer Dart.

Gallery

See also
List of buses

References

External links

Alexander Dennis Pointer product website - Web archive

Pointer
Full-size buses
Low-floor buses
Midibuses
Pointer
Vehicles introduced in 1991